Roorkee College of Engineering, Roorkee (RCE) is an engineering college located at Roorkee, Uttarakhand, India. It is affiliated to Uttarakhand Technical University,  and approved by the All India Council for Technical Education (AICTE). The college is located at Roorkee on the Roorkee Haridwar Canal Road.

The college offers diploma, B. Tech. and M. Tech. courses in various disciplines.

Department

RCE Roorkee has 10 academic departments covering engineering, management programs, agriculture and master of technology programs.

Departments
Civil Engineering
Computer Engineering
Electrical and Electronics Engineering
Mechanical Engineering
Electronics and Communication Engineering
Management Studies
Applied Science and Humanities
Masters of Technology 
Computer science Engineering
Electronics and Communication Engineering
 Agriculture
 Forestry

Awards 
Roorkee College of Engineering received the Christian Medical Association of India (CMAI) National Uttarakhand Education Award in 2013. held on 11-02-2013 at Dehradun under the category of "Best Upcoming Engineering College" in entire Uttarakhand State. This award was presented by Vijay Bahuguna (Chief Minister of Uttarakhand) and Prof. D.S. Chauhan (Vice Chancellor of UTU Dehradun).

References

External links

Engineering colleges in Uttarakhand
All India Council for Technical Education
Education in Roorkee
Educational institutions established in 2010
2010 establishments in Uttarakhand